Joan of Arc is a monumental bronze sculpture by French sculptor Paul Dubois. It depicts Joan of Arc both as a warrior and as a divinely inspired visionary.

The original plaster was presented at the Salon in 1889, on a commission by the city of Reims in 1887. Dubois donated it in 1902 to the Musée Paul-Dubois-Alfred Boucher in Nogent-sur-Seine, now an annex of the Musée Camille Claudel. An earlier plaster version is at the Ny Carlsberg Glyptotek in Copenhagen.

There are four casts of the sculpture in public settings:
 in front of Saint-Augustin Church in Paris (1895), cast by Edmond Gruet Jeune, purchased in 1895 by the Fine Arts Directorate of the French Government and placed on its current location in 1900;
 in front of St Maurice's Church, Strasbourg (1897), cast by E. Gruet Jeune, initially intended for the Musée du Luxembourg; then placed in Strasbourg in front of the Palais du Rhin in 1922, damaged by German occupation forces during World War II, and placed in its current location in 1965; 
 on Meridian Hill Park (1922), reduced-scale cast by Rudier, inaugurated on January 6, 1923, in presence of President Warren G. Harding.

Gallery

See also

 Jeanne d'Arc (Frémiet)

Notes

Outdoor sculptures in France
Monuments and memorials in Paris
Buildings and structures in Reims
Buildings and structures in Strasbourg
Works about Joan of Arc